Quandyq Ualihanuly Bishimbaev (Ķuandıķ Uälïxanůlı Bïşimbaev; born 11 April 1980) is a Kazakh politician who served as Minister of National Economy from 6 May 2016 to 28 December 2016.

Early life and education 
Bishimbaev was born in the city of Kzyl-Orda (now Kyzylorda) in 1980. At the age of six, he ended school and by the age of 19 he already had a diploma in economics. In 1999, he graduated from the Narxoz University in Almaty then in 2001, from the Dulaty University. That same year, he earned masters in business administration from the George Washington University in Washington, D.C. as part of the Boshalaq scholarship.

Career 
From 2001, Bishimbaev worked as manager of the Borrowing and Structured Finance Department, general manager of the Treasury Department of the Development Bank of Kazakhstan JSC. From 2002 to 2003, he was the head of the Functional Analysis Division of the Budget Policy and Planning Department, deputy head of the Investment Planning and Analysis Directorate of the Ministry of Economy and Budget Planning until becoming the managing director and a member of the board of the National Innovation Fund JSC. In 2004, Bishimbaev became the deputy chairman of the management board, member of the management board of JSC Center for Marketing and Analytical Research. From February 2005, he served as vice president of JSC Ordabasy Corporation and the chairman of the Board of Directors of JSC Interkomshina.

In October 2005, Bishimbaev was appointed as the advisor to the Minister of Economy and Budget Planning, where he worked until he was appointed as advisor to the Deputy Prime Minister of Kazakhstan in February 2006. That same year, he was the president of the Center for the Development of Trade Policy JSC under the Ministry of Industry and Trade. From January 2007 to February 2008, Bishimbaev served as Vice Minister of Industry and Trade until becoming the head of the Department of Socio-Economic Monitoring of the Administration of the President of Kazakhstan in February 2008.

On 22 May 2009, Bishimbaev was appointed as the assistant to the President of Kazakhstan, where he served the post until becoming the Vice Minister of Trade and Economic Development on 16 March 2010. From May 2011 to May 2013, he worked as deputy chairman of the Board of the Samruk-Kazyna Fund. On 30 May 2013, Bishimbaev was appointed as chairman of the board of the Baiterek National Managing Holding.

On 6 May 2016, he was appointed as Minister of National Economy after waves of unrest during the protests against land reforms to replace Erbolat Dosaev, however he was eventually dismissed from his post on 28 December 2016.

Corruption charges and imprisonment 
On 10 January 2017, by the National Bureau for Combating Corruption, Bishimbaev was convicted of allegedly receiving bribes on an especially large scale, in a group of persons by prior conspiracy where he was placed under arrest on 12 January.

On 14 March 2018, the Interdistrict Specialized Court for Criminal Cases of Astana found Bishimbaev guilty under the Criminal Code of the Republic of Kazakhstan. As a result, he was to 10 years of imprisonment with serving a sentence in an institution of the maximum security penal system and was barred the right to hold leading positions in the civil service for life in any state organization, authorized capital of which the state share is more than 50%. Bishimbaev's property was confiscated that acquired with funds obtained by criminal means.

Bishimbaev appealed to President Nursultan Nazarbayev for pardon which was granted in February 2019, and his prison term was reduced from 10 to 4 years. Bishimbaev was eventually early released from prison on 11 October 2019.

References 

1980 births
Living people
George Washington University alumni
Narxoz University alumni
People from Kyzylorda
Government ministers of Kazakhstan
Nur Otan politicians